Alejandro Jadresic Marinovic (6 June 1956 – 5 June 2019) was a Chilean industrial engineer, economist and an academic. He served as Minister of Energy (1994–1998) under the government of Eduardo Frei.

Education and career
Jadresic was the son of the psychiatrist, Víctor Jadresic Vargas and the academic Mimi Marinovic. He studied at the Liceum A-8 in Santiago de Chile and was accepted into the University of Chile after getting one of the highest scores (812) in the Academic Aptitude Exam in the country. He graduated with a masters in Industrial Engineering from the University of Chile and subsequently continued his education at Harvard University where he completed a Ph.D. in economics in 1984.

After completing his studies in the United States, Jadresic returned to Chile and began to make a living as a teacher. He also became politically active in campaigns that supported an end to the Pinochet regime, nevertheless he always remained an independent from the major anti-Pinochet political parties.

He was Dean of the Faculty of Engineering and Sciences at the Adolfo Ibáñez University, he also was a board member of Entel (Chile’s main telecommunications company) and director of Jadresic Consulting Ltd a business services firm.

Awards
Jadresic was awarded the Best Engineer Award 2005 from the School of Engineers of Chile and the Order of Prince Trpimir from the Republic of Croatia.

References

External links
Biography 

2019 deaths
20th-century Chilean economists
Chilean engineers
Academic staff of Adolfo Ibáñez University
Energy ministers
University of Chile alumni
Harvard University alumni
Chilean people of Croatian descent
1956 births
Government ministers of Chile
21st-century Chilean economists